"Conceived" is the first single released by Beth Orton from her album Comfort of Strangers. It was released as a download single via iTunes on 29 November 2005, and then on CD and vinyl on 30 January 2006. It peaked at #44 in the UK official singles chart. It also peaked at #6 on the US's Triple A chart.

Track listing

7": EMI / EM 681 Pakistan 
 "Conceived"
 "Rectify #2"

CD: EMI / CDEM 681 United Kingdom 
 "Conceived"
 "Endless Day"

Beth Orton songs
2005 singles
2005 songs
Songs written by Beth Orton
EMI Records singles
Astralwerks singles